Paul Hanley and Kevin Ullyett were the defending champions, but lost in the semifinals this year.

Mark Knowles and Daniel Nestor won the title, defeating Bob Bryan and Mike Bryan 7–6(7–4), 7–5 in the final.

Seeds
All seeds receive a bye into the second round.

Draw

Finals

Top half

Bottom half

External links
 Draw

Doubles